Spitak, is a town in the northern Lori Province of Armenia.

Spitak may also refer to:

, a former administrative district around Spitak (1937—1995)
Spitak Pass, Armenia
Spitak River, a tributary of Chknakh in Debed river basin
Spitak earthquake
Spitak (film), a 2018 Armenian film